The Fort Scott Greyhounds are the sports teams of Fort Scott Community College located in Fort Scott, Kansas, United States. They participate in the National Junior College Athletic Association and in the Kansas Jayhawk Community College Conference. The Greyhounds football team won the 1970 NJCAA Football championship and finished as national runner up in 1971, 1972 and 2009.

Sports

Men's sports
 Baseball
 Basketball
 Rodeo
 Track and field
 Cross country

Women's sports
 Basketball
 Rodeo
 Softball
 Volleyball
 Flag football
 Track and field
 Cross country

Termination of football program
Fort Scott Community College terminated its football program on Nov. 8, 2021, just a day after the season ended with a 65-2 loss to Independence in the Kansas Jayhawk Community College Conference playoffs. The college cited rules changes concerning out-of-state roster limits and scholarship funding that were enacted in 2016 among the reasons for cutting the program. The Greyhounds played their first game in 1923 and finished with an overall record of 448-428-23.

Facilities
Fort Scott Community College has three athletics facilities.
 Arnold Arena – home of the men's and women's basketball teams, Rodeo teams, and Volleyball team
 Lions Field – home of the Greyhounds baseball team
 Betty Ruth Willard Complex – home of the Lady Greyhounds softball team

Notable alumni

References

External links